The 1990 Norwich Union Grand Prix was a professional invitational snooker tournament. The final stages took place in October 1990 in Monte Carlo, Monaco.

John Parrott won the tournament by defeating Steve Davis 4–2 in the final.

Main draw

References

Norwich Union Grand Prix
Norwich Union Grand Prix
Norwich Union Grand Prix
Norwich Union Grand Prix